Lonnie G. "Geno" Segers Jr. is an American actor known for his roles as Chayton Littlestone in the Cinemax original series Banshee, Dwayne in NBC's Perfect Harmony, Mason Makoola in the Disney XD television series Pair of Kings, Kincaid on MTV's Teen Wolf and also as co-host of Fort Boyard: Ultimate Challenge for two seasons.

Early life 
Born Lonnie G. Segers Jr., he is the oldest son of Lonnie G. Segers Sr. and Sandra Eldridge. 

Segers was an American football player, wrestler, and track athlete in high school and college. He played American football at Western Carolina University.

Segers then played professional rugby league. He played in the American National Rugby League and won two caps for United States national rugby league team against Wales national rugby league team in 1995. From there, he moved to New Zealand to play for the Richmond Rovers rugby league team.

Career
At the suggestion of a friend, Segers auditioned for voice ads at a New Zealand radio station. His natural bass tone earned him a lot of attention, and caught the attention of an agent that led Segers to be cast as Mufasa in the Australian production of The Lion King. He went on to star in the American and Chinese productions as well.

In 2010, Segers gained a main role on Pair of Kings as Mason Makoola.

In 2015, Segers appeared in the film Bone Tomahawk, where he starred as a major antagonist called "Boar Tusk", a savage and mute member of an extremely violent cannibalistic mute clan, called the "Troglodytes.

In 2018, Segers recurred on the TV series Knight Squad as the main villain Ryker. He reprised this role in a crossover episode of Henry Danger.

Segers voices Hekarro, Leader of the Tenakth, in Horizon Forbidden West.

Personal life 
Segers has been with girlfriend Maria Cann since 2011.

Filmography

Film

Television

References

External links 

Year of birth missing (living people)
21st-century American male actors
Actors from Winston-Salem, North Carolina
American male stage actors
American male television actors
American male voice actors
American people who self-identify as being of Native American descent
American rugby league players
Living people
Male actors from North Carolina
Richmond Bulldogs players
Western Carolina University alumni
Western Carolina Catamounts football players